John Patrick Ducker AO (29 March 1932 – 25 November 2005), Australian labour leader and politician, played a leading role in the Australian labour movement and the Labor Party for 20 years.

Background
Ducker was born in Kingston upon Hull, in northern England, the son of a bus driver, and worked on the docks from the age of 14. He migrated to Australia with his family in 1950, and became an ironworker and active in the Federated Ironworkers Association, at that time controlled by the Communist Party of Australia. Ducker, a convert to Catholicism, was a strong anti-Communist and became a supporter of B.A. Santamaria's Industrial Groups, which campaigned successfully to overturn the Communist control of the union.

Career
From 1952, Ducker was an official of the union under the new anti-Communist leader, Laurie Short (a non-Catholic). When the Labor Party split in 1955 over the related issues of Communism and the role of Santamaria's "Movement" within the party, Ducker did not follow many other Catholic anti-Communists into the Democratic Labor Party, but remained in the Labor Party, becoming a leading figure in the party's right wing. His characteristic North English accent led to him becoming known as "Broovver Dooker" throughout the movement.

In 1961, Ducker moved from the Ironworkers to the Labor Council of New South Wales, becoming first an organiser and in 1975 becoming secretary. In 1972, he was appointed a member of the New South Wales Legislative Council. He was also president of the New South Wales Labor Party and vice-president of the Australian Council of Trade Unions. In these positions he supported successive New South Wales Labor leaders such as Pat Hills, Neville Wran and Barrie Unsworth (also a Catholic convert). In 1973, he was the main organiser of the leadership coup which replaced Hills as leader with Wran, who went on to become Premier of New South Wales for ten years.

Ducker was also a powerful supporter of Federal Labor Leader Gough Whitlam in his battles with the left wing of the Labor Party during the 1960s. In 1970, Ducker was a leading figure in the internal crisis in the Labor Party that cemented Whitlam's leadership. Convinced of the need to remove the left-wing controllers of the Victorian branch of the party if Labor was to win the 1972 federal election, Ducker did a deal with the left-wing leader Clyde Cameron, under which the right shared power with the left in the New South Wales branch in exchange for Cameron's support for the reform of the Victorian branch.

According to historian C. J. Coventry, Ducker was a "prolific informer" for the United States of American throughout the 1970s, providing inside-information about the Labor Party and the ACTU. During this time Ducker secretly helped the United States resolve industrial disputes. For example, when Frank Sinatra insulted women journalists, causing a nationwide boycott of the singer, Ducker worked with the Ambassador and ACTU President Bob Hawke to bring about a quick resolution. 

He had a long association with Mater Maria Catholic College.

In 1979, Ducker's health declined and he resigned all his official positions, but Wran appointed him chairman of the New South Wales Public Service Board. He remained a powerful influence behind the scenes, supporting younger Labor leaders such as Graham Richardson, Bob Carr and Paul Keating. He was made an Officer of the Order of Australia in 1979, and the Catholic Church awarded him a Papal knighthood. He was also appointed to several company boards, including Qantas and the poker machine giant Aristocrat Leisure Industries.

Community 
Ducker was appointed (1988–2000) as both the NSW chair of the Duke of Edinburgh's International Award – Australia and a national board director.

References

External links
Condolence Debate in the New South Wales Legislative Council

1932 births
2005 deaths
Converts to Roman Catholicism
Members of the New South Wales Legislative Council
Australian Labor Party members of the Parliament of New South Wales
Labor Right politicians
Australian labour movement
Officers of the Order of Australia